Prof. Dr. Shri Mohan Jain is an Indian-born plant biotechnology scientist. He worked several years for the International Atomic Energy Agency in Vienna. He has done research on genetically modified food, mutation breeding, ornamental plants, date palm, and tropical fruit, such as banana. He has edited 44 internationally sold books.

He was listed in Marquis Who's Who in the World 13th edition, 1996 and Who's Who in Science & Engineering, 4th edition, 1997.

Education

Dr. Jain completed his bachelor's degree at the Chaudhary Charan Singh Haryana Agricultural University in Hisar, Haryana, India (1966–1970). After that he continued his studies to receive a Master of Science from the Genetics department at the G.B. Pant University of Agriculture and Technology in Pantnagar, Nainital, India (1970–1972).

In 1972 he started his studies in Master of Philosophy in Jawaharlal Nehru University in New Delhi, India and finally completed his studies with PhD from the same university in 1978.

Research areas

Dr. Jain's research interests include Date palm, Arbequina, and Bananas and plantains to make a more stable and profitable crop by innovative approaches and conventional breeding. Other significant research areas are potato and ornamental plants, such as rose, begonia, orchids, African violets, and brassicas.

References

 Shri Mohan Jain; P. M. Priyadarshan (1 January 2009), Breeding Plantation Tree Crops: Tropical Species, Springer 
 Who's Who in the World 13th edition, 1996, 
 IAEA Plant Breeding and Genetics Newsletter July 2005, p. 2, http://www-naweb.iaea.org/nafa/pbg/public/pb-nl-15.pdf
 https://tuhat.halvi.helsinki.fi/portal/en/persons/shri-mohan-jain(25de45e5-9d06-40cf-9fc0-5f24952225a4).html
 http://www.fao.org/docrep/007/ae216e/ae216e02.htm
 https://www.researchgate.net/profile/Shri_Jain
 http://www.geneconserve.pro.br/site/pags/editorial-board3.php?id=24
 https://www.researchgate.net/publication/267735656_httpejfa.infoindex.phpejfaissueview611showToc

External links
http://www.barnesandnoble.com/c/shri-mohan-jain

1949 births
Living people
Scientists from Delhi
Academic staff of the University of Helsinki
International Atomic Energy Agency
Jawaharlal Nehru University alumni
Indian biotechnologists